The Free Methodist Church is a historic building in Dayton, Oregon, United States. Built in the 19th century, the church building is now occupied by the Dayton Assembly of God Church. The structure was added to the National Register of Historic Places on March 16, 1987.

It was built by a John Watson, who also built other structures in the Dayton area.  He served as the first pastor.

References

Romanesque Revival architecture in Oregon
Romanesque Revival church buildings in the United States
Churches completed in 1885
Free Methodist Church
Former Methodist church buildings in the United States
Methodist churches in Oregon
Pentecostal churches in Oregon
Churches on the National Register of Historic Places in Oregon
National Register of Historic Places in Yamhill County, Oregon
Buildings and structures in Dayton, Oregon
Churches in Yamhill County, Oregon
1885 establishments in Oregon